Lauren Amber Aquilina (born 23 June 1995) is a Maltese-English singer and songwriter. Born in Bristol, she gained popularity by independently releasing a trilogy of EPs (Fools, Sinners, and Liars) whilst studying at school. Her debut album Isn't It Strange? was released on 26 August 2016, after being signed with Island Records and Universal Music Group. Aquilina took a musical hiatus in October 2016, but resumed in August 2018.

Life and career
Aquilina was born on 23 June 1995 in Bristol to parents from Malta. Her musical origins began with her playing piano in school. She has been singing since she was eight years old and has been playing piano since she was nine. When she was thirteen years old she attended her first open mic event and sang "Poker Face" by Lady Gaga while her mother filmed her. Aquilina's manager (at the time), Ryan Walter, came across one of the videos and the two began working with one another putting together Aquilina's initial EP Fools.

In December 2011, Aquilina uploaded a cover of Brenda Russell's song "Get Here", which she recorded at home to raise money for the Meningitis Trust. She said that she was "trying to raise as much money as I can for a good cause, especially at Christmas time." In August 2012, Aquilina announced her independently released debut EP Fools through her management label Interlude Artists which was released on iTunes on 22 October 2012. To promote her EP, Aquilina performed an eight-song set in Tromsø, Norway, and was noticed by a Norwegian newspaper who called Aquilina "a great, talented songwriter who plays piano to accompany her beautiful voice." In September 2012, Aquilina announced through social media that she would be headlining her very first UK tour in early 2013. The title track from Fools received its first UK national radio play on BBC Radio 1 on 15 October 2012 on the BBC Introducing show.

It was announced on 15 August 2013 that Aquilina would headline the BBC Introducing stage at Reading & Leeds Festival 2013. She also played her first ever show in the United States on 21 August 2013, when she played a sold-out headline show at Manhattan's Rockwood Hall. Aquilina released her final EP Liars in the Fools, Sinners, Liars EP trilogy on 10 March 2014. Having asked to hear Lauren's third EP Liars, which she recorded and marketed with her manager, Island Records and Universal Music Group signed Aquilina as a new artist. In June 2014, Aquilina collaborated with Scottish band Prides on one of their tracks, "Strong Enough". Aquilina released her debut album Isn't It Strange? under Island Records and Universal Music Group on 26 August 2016 (Enn Kosova-Maudling). On 10 October 2016, Aquilina announced on her Twitter and Facebook accounts that she was no longer going to be writing music or performing for herself and that Isn't It Strange? would be her final album. In November 2020, she admitted that her break from the music industry had to do with mental health issues and credits working with Kylie Minogue as the catalyst for getting her excited about it once again.

Aquilina returned to music in 2018 with "Psycho", from an EP set for a 2020 release. This was followed by numerous singles, including "Tobacco In My Sheets" in March 2019, "Swap Places" in October 2020, and "Best Friend" in November 2020. Following the release of "Best Friend", Aquilina announced the release of her EP Ghost World, which was released on 13 November 2020. On 23 April 2021, she released the single "The Knife".

Reception
Music reviewing website "Sound Of The Day" praised Aquilina's vocals in her cover of Lana Del Rey's "Born To Die":
"[She] took this cover and exploded it, and took [Del Rey's] vocals to another level. She has convinced me that with her very touching and emotional feel to her voice, she can change the course of many up and coming musicians. She is just in her room with a mic and keyboard, and has something to say, imagine her in an actual studio with better equipment. This girl could be a force on whatever label she signs with. The song and Lauren remind me of the beautiful Adele. Adele has a very powerful voice and people know when she is in the room. Lauren has that presence with her beautiful voice and amazing talent."

Fortitude Magazine writer Maxie Molotov-Smith complimented Aquilina's musical approach and rated her third EP, Liars, a five out of five star rating. Praising, "Lauren’s sound is beautifully crafted soul-inflected Piano Pop (a sound that Sara Bareilles, Chantal Kreviazuk and Regina Spektor have been known to dabble in) that conjures lifting atmospheres, honey-sweet vocals and some of the wisest lyrics that any teenage songwriter has ever written".

Influences
Aquilina credits Stereophonics, Coldplay, Red Hot Chili Peppers and Annie Lennox as influences.

Personal life
Aquilina identifies as bisexual.

Discography

Studio albums

Extended plays

Singles

Featured tracks
 "Flaws & Ceilings" with Frank Hamilton (2012)
 "Strong Enough" with Prides (2014)
 "FU4E" with Lost Kings (2019)

Songwriting credits

References

Living people
1995 births
21st-century English women singers
English people of Maltese descent
English women pop singers
English soul singers
English women singer-songwriters
Island Records artists
Musicians from Bristol
Universal Music Group artists
English LGBT singers
English LGBT songwriters
Bisexual songwriters
Bisexual singers